No. 575 Squadron RAF was a transport squadron of the Royal Air Force during the Second World War.

History
The squadron was formed at RAF Hendon on 1 February 1944 from elements of 512 Squadron. Just two weeks later it moved to RAF Broadwell to work-up as a tactical transport squadron with the Douglas Dakota, the military transport version of the Douglas DC-3 airliner. The squadron's first operations were leaflet raids on France, on the eve of D-Day it dropped the 5th Para brigade into the invasion drop zone (Operation Tonga). On 6 June it towed 21 gliders into France. In the next few weeks it started a casualty evacuation service from France back to England. In September 1944 it was heavily involved in operations at Arnhem, suffering casualties.

After the end of the war the squadron began flying to and from India from RAF Melbourne in Yorkshire and later from RAF Blakehill Farm. In January 1946 it moved to RAF Bari in Italy to operate an air service between Italy, Austria, Romania, Greece and Bulgaria. It was eventually disbanded at RAF Kabrit, Egypt on 15 August 1946.

Aircraft operated

Squadron bases

Commanding officers

See also
List of Royal Air Force aircraft squadrons

References

Notes

Bibliography

External links

 No 541-598 Squadron Histories on rafweb
 History of No. 575 Squadron on raf.mod.uk

Aircraft squadrons of the Royal Air Force in World War II
Transport units and formations of the Royal Air Force
575 Squadron
Military units and formations established in 1944